Bojan Mišić (born 29 September 1978) is a Serbian former football goalkeeper.

Career
Mišić signed for Russian Premier League side FC Khimki on 14 August 2009 until the end of the season.  He played with FK Mladost Lučani and FK Mladi Radnik in the Serbian SuperLiga.

References

External links

1978 births
Living people
Sportspeople from Požarevac
Serbian footballers
Serbian expatriate footballers
Expatriate footballers in Russia
FK Mladi Radnik players
FK Mladost Lučani players
FK Kolubara players
FK Dinamo Pančevo players
Serbian SuperLiga players
FC Khimki players
FK Sloga Petrovac na Mlavi players
Association football goalkeepers
FC Sportakademklub Moscow players